The Towle Shale is a geologic formation in Nebraska. It preserves fossils dating back to the Carboniferous period.

See also

List of fossiliferous stratigraphic units in Nebraska
Paleontology in Nebraska

References

Carboniferous geology of Nebraska
Carboniferous southern paleotropical deposits